Eneryda is a locality situated in Älmhult Municipality, Kronoberg County, Sweden with 338 inhabitants in 2010.

References 

Populated places in Kronoberg County
Populated places in Älmhult Municipality
Värend